Andrzej Świątek (born 7 January 1958) is a Polish former ice hockey player. He played for Podhale Nowy Targ, Zagłębie Sosnowiec, and IFK Arboga IK during his career. Świątek also played for the Polish national team at the 1988 Winter Olympics and several World Championships.

References

External links
 

1958 births
Living people
IFK Arboga IK players
Ice hockey players at the 1988 Winter Olympics
KH Zagłębie Sosnowiec players
Olympic ice hockey players of Poland
People from Nowy Targ
Podhale Nowy Targ players
Polish ice hockey defencemen
Sportspeople from Lesser Poland Voivodeship
Polish expatriate sportspeople in Sweden